Thomas Steele (17 November 1753 – 8 December 1823) was a British politician at the turn of the nineteenth century.

He was born the eldest son of Thomas Steele, Recorder of Chichester and educated at Westminster School and Trinity College, Cambridge.

After studying law at the Middle Temple he was elected as MP for Chichester in 1780, holding the seat until 1807.

He held the post of Joint Secretary to the Treasury from 1783 to 1791, Joint Paymaster of the Forces from 1791 to 1804, and King's Remembrancer from 1797 to 1823. He was a friend of William Pitt the Younger.

He died in 1823. He had married Charlotte Amelia, the daughter of Sir David Lindsay, 4th Baronet, of Evelick, Perth and had a son and two daughters.  Steel(e) Point, on Sydney Harbour, Australia, was named for him when he was Joint Secretary to the Treasury during the time of Arthur Phillip's governorship.

References

1753 births
1823 deaths
People educated at Westminster School, London
Alumni of Trinity College, Cambridge
Members of the Middle Temple
Members of the Parliament of Great Britain for English constituencies
British MPs 1780–1784
British MPs 1784–1790
British MPs 1790–1796
British MPs 1796–1800
Members of the Privy Council of the United Kingdom
Paymasters of the Forces
Members of the Parliament of the United Kingdom for English constituencies
UK MPs 1801–1802
UK MPs 1802–1806
UK MPs 1806–1807